The Speaker of the National Assembly of the Gambia is the presiding officer over proceedings in the National Assembly. In the official hierarchy the speaker ranks third following President of the Gambia and Vice-President of the Gambia.

List of speakers of the Legislative Council of the Gambia

List of speakers of the House of Representatives of the Gambia

List of speakers of the National Assembly of the Gambia

References

Welcome to the National Assembly of The Gambia Official website of the National Assembly of the Gambia

Gambia